"Tha Block Is Hot" is a song by American rapper Lil Wayne featuring fellow American rappers B.G. and Juvenile. It was released on October 23, 1999 via Cash Money Records as the lead single from the former's debut solo studio album of the same name (1999). Recording sessions took place at Cash Money Studios in Metairie, Louisiana. Production was handled by Mannie Fresh with executive producers Ronald "Slim" Williams and Birdman.

The song peaked at number 72 on the Billboard Hot 100, at number 24 on the Hot R&B/Hip-Hop Songs and at number 27 on the Hot Rap Songs. It was named the 50th greatest hip hop song of all time by VH1 in 2008.

In Dave Meyers-directed music video, Lil' Wayne is getting chased by cops and successfully evades them as well as a police helicopter.

Track listing

Personnel
Dwayne Carter – main artist, vocals
Terius Gray – featured artist, vocals
Christopher Dorsey – featured artist, vocals
Byron Thomas – engineering, mixing, producer
James Cruz – mastering
Ronald "Slim" Williams – executive producer
Bryan Williams – executive producer
Dino Delvaille – A&R

Charts

References

External links

1999 songs
Lil Wayne songs
Gangsta rap songs
1999 debut singles
B.G. (rapper) songs
Juvenile (rapper) songs
Cash Money Records singles
Songs written by Lil Wayne
Songs written by Mannie Fresh
Songs written by Juvenile (rapper)
Song recordings produced by Mannie Fresh
Music videos directed by Dave Meyers (director)